Tingewick is a village and civil parish about  west of Buckingham in the unitary authority area of Buckinghamshire, England. The parish is bounded to the north by the River Great Ouse, to the east by a tributary of the Great Ouse, to the west by the county boundary with Oxfordshire and to the south by field boundaries.

The village was formerly on the A421 but from 1998 has been bypassed by a dual carriageway.

Part of the village is a Conservation Area and a number of the 450 dwellings are listed buildings.

History
The remains of a Roman villa provide evidence of early habitation in the parish. The villa was partly excavated in 1860–62.

The toponym is derived from the Old English for "Teoda's dwelling". The Domesday Book of 1086 records the village as Tedinwiche.

The earliest part of the Church of England parish church of Saint Mary Magdalene is the Norman 12th century nave. The three-bay north aisle was added in about 1200. The Perpendicular gothic chancel and bell-tower were added late in the 15th century. The north aisle was altered in the 17th century, the south aisle was added in 1830 and the south porch in 1867.

The tower has a ring of five bells. The oldest was cast in London in about 1490 and is inscribed Nomen Magdalene Campana Gerit Melodie. The second bell was cast by Bartholomew Atton of Buckingham in 1591. Robert Atton of Buckingham cast the fourth bell in 1623 and the treble bell in 1627. The youngest bell in the ring is the tenor, cast by Henry Bagley III of Chacombe and Witney in 1721.

Amenities
The village has one public house, the Royal Oak, with The Crown, a grade II listed building, closing permanently in 2013. Tingewick has a village hall, a Post Office and village shop, a pottery, an auction room, an agricultural metal work factory, an animal feed warehouse and a farm supplies depot.

Tingewick is served by Roundwood Primary School, which was formed by merging the Tingewick and Gawcott infants schools.

The village has held three large charity concerts called 'Party in the Paddock' in 2004, 2005 and 2008. The event has included acts such as Bernie Marsden, Roger Daltrey with The Who, Zak Starkey, Marillion, Don Airey  and Nikki Murray. There are rumours circulating that Peter Andre is set to appear in the summer of 2022 along with special guest Naan Bread, however nothing has been officially confirmed.

Tingewick Meadows is a Site of Special Scientific Interest south of the village.

References

Sources

External links

The People of Tingewick

Villages in Buckinghamshire
Civil parishes in Buckinghamshire